Domenico Semeraro (born 3 February 1964) is a Swiss bobsledder who competed in the early 1990s. At the 1994 Winter Olympics in Lillehammer, he won a silver medal in the four-man event with his teammates Gustav Weder, Donat Acklin and Kurt Meier.

Semeraro also won a gold medal in the four-man event at the 1993 FIBT World Championships in Igls.

References
Bobsleigh four-man Olympic medalists for 1924, 1932-56, and since 1964
Bobsleigh four-man world championship medalists since 1930
DatabaseOlympics.com profile

1964 births
Bobsledders at the 1994 Winter Olympics
Living people
Olympic silver medalists for Switzerland
Olympic bobsledders of Switzerland
Swiss male bobsledders
Place of birth missing (living people)
Olympic medalists in bobsleigh
Medalists at the 1994 Winter Olympics
20th-century Swiss people